The 2011 Roma Open was a professional tennis tournament played on clay courts. It was the third edition of the tournament which was part of the 2011 ATP Challenger Tour. It took place in Rome, Italy between 2 and 8 May 2011.

ATP entrants

Seeds

 Rankings are as of April 25, 2011.

Other entrants
The following players received wildcards into the singles main draw:
  Simone Bolelli
  Nicolás Massú
  Matteo Trevisan
  Simone Vagnozzi

The following players received entry from the qualifying draw:
  Andrea Arnaboldi
  Pablo Carreño Busta
  Juan Sebastián Cabal
  Carlos Salamanca

Champions

Singles

 Simone Bolelli def.  Eduardo Schwank, 2–6, 6–1, 6–3

Doubles

 Juan Sebastián Cabal /  Robert Farah def.  Santiago González /  Travis Rettenmaier, 2–6, 6–3, [11–9]

External links
Official Website
ITF Search
ATP official site

Roma Open
Clay court tennis tournaments
Roma Open
May 2011 sports events in Italy